Kinnikannanvilai is a village on the west coast of Kanyakumari, Tamil Nadu, India, flanked by Muhilankudieruppu in the south and Kovilvilai in the north. Kinnikannanvilai is bound by Puviyoor in the east and Arabian Sea in the west. The village is connected with Kanyakumari Bus Terminus (4 km) and Nagercoil town (16 km) by road. The nearest city is Thiruvananthapuram (Capital of Kerala).

Villages in Kanyakumari district